Matthew Parziale (born June 5, 1987) is an American amateur golfer and winner of the 2017 U.S. Mid-Amateur.

Golf career
Parziale played his college golf for Southeastern University. As a sophomore, he led the Fire to the 2007 NCCAA national title. After college, Parziale played professional golf for three years, but struggled to make a living and regained his amateur status in 2012.

Parziale competed in the 2016 U.S. Mid-Amateur championship where he posted rounds of 72-74 (+6) and advanced to the match play portion of the tournament. In  his first match he played #26 seed Trevor Randolph and was defeated 4 and 3.

In 2017, Parziale won the Massachusetts State Amateur Championship for the first time by defeating Matt Cowgill in the 36-hole final, 4 and 3. Later in the year Parziale won the 2017 U.S. Mid-Amateur by defeating Josh Nichols, 8 and 6 in the final. 

As U.S. Mid-Amateur champion, Parziale was invited to the 2018 Masters Tournament, where he missed the cut after shooting 81-79 (+16). Parziale also was exempt into the 2018 U.S. Open, where he tied for 48th place and tied for low-amateur for the tournament with rounds of 74-73-74-75 (+16). After the 2018 U.S. Open, Parziale played in the Massachusetts State Amateur Championship where he scored rounds of 70-70 (E) during the stroke play portion. In the first round of match play he defeated #24 seed Steven DiLisio, 5 and 3. In the round of 16 he beat #8 seed Matt Cowgill, 3 and 2. During the quarter-finals he matched up against #16 seed Patrick Frodigh and lost 3 and 2. He competed at the 2018 U.S. Amateur later in the year and shot rounds of 78-78 (+13) and failed to reach match play. As defending champion, Parziale competed in the 2018 U.S. Mid-Amateur where he T-26th in stroke play after shooting 76-68 (+2) and qualified for match play as the #34 seed. In the first round he faced #31 seed Andres Schonbaum and lost 3 and 2.

Parziale qualified for 2019 U.S. Open after finishing second, 1-over (142 strokes) in 36 total holes, in the Purchase, New York Sectional Qualifying Tournament. At the championship, he missed the cut by 7 strokes after shooting 74-77 (+9). Parziale was invited to the 2019 Porter Cup in Lewiston, New York. He shot rounds of 73-67-65-70 (−13) and T-5th in the tournament. Parziale competed at the 2019 Massachusetts State Amateur Championship. He shot rounds of 75-73 (+6) and qualified for match play as the #32 seed. In the first round he defeated #1 seed Herbie Aikens, 3 and 1. In the round of 16, Parziale defeated Cody Booska, 7 and 6. In his quarterfinal match, he lost to eventual champion Steve DiLisio, 7 and 6. He competed at the 2019 U.S. Amateur at Pinehurst #2 and #4 and missed match play after opening with rounds of 72-80 (+12). In the fall of 2019, Parziale competed in the U.S. Mid-Amateur where he shot rounds of 70-72 (E) to T-13th and qualify for match play for the fourth year in a row. In match play, he lost to Jeremy Gearheart, 4 and 3, in the first round.

In 2020, Parziale won the Brockton City Open with rounds of 67-67 (−8). At the 2020 Massachusetts State Amateur Championship he posted scores of 69-70 (−3) in the stroke play portion and earned the #2 seed going into match play. In round 1, he defeated #31 seed Tommy Parker, 1 up. In the round of 16, he was matched against #15 seed Chris Tarallo and beat him 4 and 3. In the quarter-finals he defeated #7 seed Weston Jones, 3 and 2. He was defeated in the semi-finals by #14 seed Nick Maccario, 1 up. Later in the summer, Parziale earned an exemption into the U.S. Amateur where he shot rounds of 80-77 (+14) and did not advance to match play. At the 2020 Massachusetts Mid-Amateur Championship, Parziale was attempting to win for the third time. He posted rounds of 67-68-75 (−6) and went into a playoff with Arthur Zenneti where he was defeated. 

During the 2021 season, Parziale competed in the Massachusetts State Amateur Championship were he defeated Kevin Gately 3 and 2, Frank Vana III 5 and 4, Ben Spitz 2 and 1 and Christopher Bornhurst 4 and 3 en route to the finals. In the finals he met Michael Thornbjornsen and was defeated 8 and 6. Later in the year, he competed in the Massachusetts Mid-Amateur Championship, where he shot 69-69 (−6) en route to his third victory in this event.

In 2022, Parziale competed in the Massachusetts State Amateur Championship and shot rounds of 75-73 (+8) in stroke play. He qualified for match play as the #29 seed an met Rickey Stimets in the opening round. He was defeated in 19 holes.

Personal life
Parziale served as a firefighter in Brockton, Massachusetts until 2019, when he left to become an insurance broker.

Amateur wins
2008 Worcester County Amateur
2009 Ouimet Memorial
2013 Ouimet Memorial
2015 Massachusetts Mid-Amateur Championship, Worcester County Amateur, Norfolk County Classic
2016 Massachusetts Mid-Amateur Championship
2017 U.S. Mid-Amateur, Massachusetts Amateur, Ouimet Memorial
2020 Brockton City Open
2021 Massachusetts Mid-Amateur Championship

Results in major championships
Results not in chronological order before 2019.

LA = Low amateur
CUT = missed the half-way cut
"T" = tied for place

References

American male golfers
Amateur golfers
American firefighters
Southeastern University (Florida) alumni
Sportspeople from Brockton, Massachusetts
1987 births
Living people